Bodmin College is a secondary academy school that serves the community of Bodmin, Cornwall, England. The principal is Emmie Seward-Adams. The college converted to an academy on 1 January 2011.

Curriculum 
In 2007, the college decided to change the GCSE curriculum by introducing a three-year course rather than the conventional two years. Students now choose their GCSE options in Year 8, and take end of year exams in the summer term of year 11. The first year of students to do this finished their GCSE course in the summer term of 2010.

Sixth Form 
The college has sixth form college, catering for approximately 300 sixth form students. The Sixth Form Council maintain standards throughout the Sixth Form as well as acting as the student voice.

The college 
The college entered the BBC TV programme Robot Wars, with the robots Roadblock and Beast of Bodmin, winning Series 1 with Roadblock.

Bodmin College Jazz Orchestra 
The Bodmin College Jazz Orchestra are a group of young musicians under the tutelage of Benji Vincent who play a range of music in a big band jazz style; from Ellington, to the Beatles, to Santana. All the members of the Jazz Orchestra are students at the College.
They have regularly toured abroad to Germany, France, Spain, and Australia. 
The Jazz Orchestra play at functions; fetes, wedding parties, fund raising events, formal concerts and open days.

School Musical Productions 
In recent years the College has produced a musical production most years. They are directed by Benji Vincent and are collaborations between the Drama, Dance, Art, Textiles, and Music departments of the school. Productions include Avenue Q in 2015, The Lion King in 2016, Aladdin in 2017, Chicago in 2019, Mary Poppins in 2020, and Ghost the Musical in 2022.

Notable former pupils 
 Andy Reed, rugby player for British Lions and Scotland
 Dan Rogerson, MP for North Cornwall
 Lorna Dunkley, Sky News presenter
 Ross Green, actor

References

External links 

School website
Department for Children, Schools and Families Performance Tables (GCSE and equivalent)

Academies in Cornwall
Bodmin
Secondary schools in Cornwall